Annedore Richter (born 14 November 1948) is a German volleyball player. She competed in the women's tournament at the 1972 Summer Olympics.

References

1948 births
Living people
German women's volleyball players
Olympic volleyball players of West Germany
Volleyball players at the 1972 Summer Olympics
Sportspeople from Münster